"Spain" is an instrumental jazz fusion composition by jazz pianist and composer Chick Corea. It is likely Corea's most recognized piece, and is considered a jazz standard.

"Spain" was composed in 1971 and appeared in its original (and best-known) rendition on the album Light as a Feather, with performances by Corea (Rhodes electric piano), Airto Moreira (drums), Flora Purim (vocals and percussion), Stanley Clarke (bass), and Joe Farrell (flute). It has been recorded in several versions, by Corea himself as well as by other artists, including a flamenco version by Paco de Lucía, Al Di Meola and John McLaughlin in the 1980s, and a progressive bluegrass version by Béla Fleck  in 1979. A version with lyrics by Al Jarreau, "Spain (I Can Recall)", appeared on the 1980 album This Time. More recently, Corea had performed his composition as a duo with Japanese pianist Hiromi Uehara. A version of "Spain" was performed by Stevie Wonder at his 2008 Concert in London. The introduction used in the song is from Concierto de Aranjuez, a guitar concerto by the Spanish composer Joaquín Rodrigo. 

The Light as a Feather version of "Spain" received two Grammy nominations, for Best Instrumental Arrangement and for Best Instrumental Jazz Performance by a Group. In 2001, Corea was awarded the Best Instrumental Arrangement Grammy for "Spain for Sextet and Orchestra".

Composition

Corea opens the Light as a Feather version of "Spain" with the adagio from Joaquin Rodrigo's Concierto de Aranjuez. After the intro, the song switches to a fast, steady samba-like rhythm, in which the main theme and an improvisation part are repeated.

The chord progression used during the improvisation part is based on harmonic progressions in Rodrigo's concerto. It runs as follows:

  | Gmaj7 | F#7 | Em7 A7 | Dmaj7 (Gmaj7) | C#7 F#7 | Bm B7 |

Appearances
By Chick Corea

 Light as a Feather (1972) - Chick Corea and Return to Forever
 Akoustic Band (1989) - Chick Corea Akoustic Band
 Play (1990) - Chick Corea and Bobby McFerrin
 Return to the Seventh Galaxy: The Anthology (CD 1996) - Chick Corea, Bill Connors, Stanley Clarke, and Lenny White
 Alexia In a Jazz Mood (1996) - Chick Corea and Alexia Vassiliou
 Solo Piano: Originals (2000) - Chick Corea 
 Corea.Concerto (2001) - Chick Corea with Origin and the London Philharmonic Orchestra
 Rendezvous in New York (CD 2003, DVD 2005) - Chick Corea Akoustic Band
 Elektric Band: Live at Montreux 2004 (2004) - Chick Corea Elektric Band
 Akoustic Band 1991 (DVD 2005) - Chick Corea Akoustic Band
 Duet (2009) - Chick Corea and Hiromi Uehara
 Trilogy (2013) - Chick Corea with Christian McBride and Brian Blade

Covers

Manhattan Wildlife Refuge (1974) - Bill Watrous
Live and Improvised (1976) - Blood Sweat & Tears
Something You Got (1977) - Art Farmer
Crossing the Tracks (1979) - Béla Fleck
This Time (1980) - Al Jarreau 
Le Beirut (1984) - Fairuz
Live With Vic Juris (1985) - Bireli Lagrene
Jaco Pastorius & Bireli Lagrene & Alex Bally (1985) - Bireli Lagrene and Jaco Pastorius
New Weave (1986) - Rare Silk
Somewhere Out There (1986) - Airmen of Note
Naurava Kulkuri (1986) - Vesa-Matti Loiri 
Sensacion (1987) - Tito Puente
Daybreak (1987) - Béla Fleck
Thousand Wave (1988) - Takahiro Matsumoto
GRP All-Star Big Band (1992) - GRP All-Star Big Band
Rosenberg Trio: Live at the North Sea Jazz Festival (1993) - Rosenberg Trio
Zlatko (1995) - Zlatko Manojlović
DGQ-20 (1996) - David Grisman Quintet
Two Guitars One Passion (1996) - Lara & Reyes
Tango del Fuego (1999) - James Galway
Czechmate (1999) - Druha Trava
Spain (2000) - Michel Camilo & Tomatito
La Nuit Des Gitans (2001) - Raphael Fays
Tribute album (2001) - Emilie-Claire Barlow               
Crosscurrent (2005) - Jake Shimabukuro
Gently Weeps (2006) - Jake Shimabukuro
Steps (2009) - Cluster
Live at Last (2008) - Stevie Wonder
The Chick Corea Songbook (2009) - The Manhattan Transfer
Acoustic Live (2009) - Pegasus (Issei Noro and Tetsuo Sakurai)
Jazz and the Philharmonic - Chick Corea, Eric Owens, Terence Blanchard, and the Henry Mancini Institute Orchestra
Kind of Spain (2017) - Wolfgang Haffner
Spain (2017) - Groove for Thought
Spain (2019) - The String Queens
Spain (2020) - Dewa 19

References

 Official biography



Songs about Spain
Instrumentals
1971 songs
1970s jazz standards
Jazz fusion standards